Ziesmer is a surname. Notable people with the surname include:

Jerry Ziesmer (1939–2021), American film director, production manager, and actor
Santiago Ziesmer (born 1953), Spanish-born German actor and film actor

See also
Ziesemer

Surnames of German origin